Thomas Raymond Bergeron (born May 6, 1955) is an American television personality, game show host, comedian and actor, best known for hosting Hollywood Squares from 1998 to 2004, America's Funniest Home Videos from 2001 to 2015, and Dancing with the Stars from 2005 to 2019.

Early life and career
Bergeron was born in Haverhill, Massachusetts, the son of Ray and Kay Bergeron. Bergeron is of French Canadian and Irish descent. While being interviewed on the Howard Stern Show, Bergeron revealed when he was 17 years old he interviewed Larry Fine and Moe Howard of the Three Stooges after contacting the nursing home Larry was living in.

His first job in broadcasting was as a disc jockey at local radio station WHAV, in his home town of Haverhill, Massachusetts.  He became a popular radio DJ in the Seacoast area of New Hampshire in the early 1980s on Portsmouth's WHEB, where he played comedy records along with music and offbeat interviews.  His popularity led to additional TV and radio auditions.

One of his first jobs on television was as host of a local game show, Granite State Challenge, on New Hampshire Public Television (produced at NHPTV flagship station WENH-TV).  He moved to the Boston market in February 1982, joining WBZ-TV as a general on-air personality.  His early roles at the station included being a contributor on Evening Magazine (1982–1987), and hosting brief informational and show preview segments known as 4 Today, every 30 minutes during WBZ's daytime lineup (1983–1987). In 1984, he landed the hosting spot on Lottery Live, the nightly drawings of the Massachusetts State Lottery games. By January 1987, while still working in these roles, Bergeron added People Are Talking to his duties. He replaced outgoing host Buzz Luttrell on the early afternoon talk show, where he gained even more popularity. While Ron Cantera took over as host of 4 Today (until its cancellation in 1988), Bergeron remained lottery host until drawings moved to WNEV-TV in August 1987. Bergeron additionally served as the original host of WBZ's weekend morning teenage discussion series Rap-Around from 1987 to 1989.

By the early 1990s, Bergeron was seen as a solid figure in Boston television, and WBZ continued to capitalize on his talents by featuring him on WBZ Radio. It was there he had an early-morning radio show called The Tom Bergeron Show. When People Are Talking ended a successful 13-year run in June 1993, Bergeron remained on WBZ-TV as commentator and lifestyle reporter for the station's expanded hour-long noon newscast. In early 1994, Bergeron briefly surfaced as a morning host on Boston's soft-rock station WMJX ("Magic 106.7"), which was only a short commute to WBZ's studios for his work on the noon news.

Bergeron credits a portion of his success as a television personality to his more than 35 years of regularly practicing Transcendental Meditation. He discussed his meditation practice on 10 Percent Happier with Dan Harris and The Fifth Dimension: A Mindfulness Podcast.

National television work
From 1994 to 1997, Bergeron co-hosted the morning show Breakfast Time on FX and later re-titled Fox After Breakfast when the show moved to the Fox Network.
Bergeron was the host of Hollywood Squares from 1998 to 2004, a role for which he won a Daytime Emmy Award for Outstanding Game Show Host in 2000.

In February 2001, he became the new host of the ABC series America's Funniest Home Videos. In March 2014, Bergeron announced on Twitter that he would not be hosting America's Funniest Home Videos after season 25. Bergeron's final episode of America's Funniest Home Videos aired May 17, 2015.  He was replaced by Alfonso Ribeiro.

In June 2005, he began hosting the reality series Dancing with the Stars, also on ABC. For his work on Dancing with the Stars, he received nine Primetime Emmy Award nominations for  Outstanding Host for a Reality or Competition Program, winning the award once in 2012. On July 13, 2020, Bergeron announced he had been let go from the series ahead of its 29th season in a message posted on Twitter. 

On September 20, 2008, Bergeron co-hosted the 60th Primetime Emmy Awards alongside Heidi Klum, Jeff Probst, Ryan Seacrest, and Howie Mandel. The five were selected to host in recognition of their nominations in the inaugural category of Outstanding Host for a Reality or Competition Program.

In 2020, Bergeron competed in the third season of The Masked Singer as "Taco".

Personal life
Bergeron married Lois Bergeron in 1982 and has two daughters.

Filmography

Film

Television

References

External links

 
 

1955 births
Living people
American game show hosts
American people of French-Canadian descent
American people of Irish descent
Daytime Emmy Award for Outstanding Game Show Host winners
Massachusetts Democrats
People from Belmont, Massachusetts
People from Haverhill, Massachusetts
Primetime Emmy Award winners
Television anchors from Boston
Beauty pageant hosts